My Destiny is the debut studio album by reggaeton singer Yomo, released on October 25, 2009.

2009 Edition

Track listing
"Yomo / Berto" (Intro)  (4:26)
"Tú Te las trae'"  (3:31)
"Descará"  (4:50)
"Mi Mujer"  (3:33)
"Secreto"  (3:53)
"Hacerte Mía"  (3:26)
"Por las Bocinas"  (5:09)
"No Vaya a Llorar"
"Gótica Sártica"  (3:47)
"Amor de Luna" (feat. Carly Tones)  (3:41)
"Del Campo a la Ciudad" (feat. Julio Sanabria)
"Tú Te las trae'" (Remix) (feat. Jowell y Randy, Ñejo y Dálmata, Voltio)  (4:56)
"My Destiny"  (7:36)

2008 Edition

Track listing
"Yomo / Berto" (Intro)  (4:26)
"Tú Te las trae'"  (3:31)
"Descará"  (4:50)
"Mi Mujer"  (3:33)
"Secreto"  (3:53)
"Hacerte Mía"  (3:26)
"Por las Bocinas"  (5:09)
"No Te Sientas Mal"  (4:52)
"Gótica Sártica"  (3:47)
"Amor de Luna" (feat. Carly Tones)  (3:41)
"Descará" (Remix) (feat. Wisin y Yandel)  (5:04)
"Tú Te las trae'" (Remix) (feat. Jowell y Randy, Ñejo y Dálmata, Voltio)  (4:56)
"My Destiny"  (7:36)

Chart performance

References

Reggaeton albums
2008 debut albums